Siege of Florence may refer to:

 Siege of Florence (405), part of the barbarian invasion of the Roman Empire
 Siege of Florence (1312), part of the Wars of the Guelphs and Ghibellines
 Siege of Florence (1529–1530), part of the War of the League of Cognac

See also
History of Florence